St. Mary High School is a secondary school located in the Highgate area of St Mary, Jamaica.

St. Mary High School is a traditional high school for grades 7 through to 13. It has an enviable academic and athletic record and is one of the most sought-after schools for PEP graduates in Northeast Jamaica. The school boasts a diverse racial makeup, the largest minority groups being East Indians and Chinese. The school was the National Schools' Debate champion in 1989, 1996, 1998, and 2005.

In common with all state-run Jamaican secondary schools, St. Mary High uses a selection process to accept students at the grade seven level. Due to the high level of competition from primary level students in St. Mary and surrounding parishes to gain entrance into St. Mary High School, one of two traditional high schools in St. Mary and the only one with a sixth form programme, the majority of entrants are higher-scoring PEP candidates. Students from most primary and preparatory schools can attempt to gain a place by sitting the Primary Exit Profile (formerly the Grade Six Achievement Test).

History 
On a little mound, a little mound which was originally part of the Constantine Lands. Then, Mitzi Seaga (née Constantine) lived in a house on that little mound and that house on the mound became St. Mary High.

The Portals of St. Mary High opened on January 12, 1960 at 8:30 a.m. to 69 pupils (31 boys and 38 girls) and four teachers including the principal, Mr. L. W. Brown, B.Sc.  Parents and students assembled, anticipating the beginning of the new school term. At that time, there were three forms, 1-1, 1-2, and 1-3. Currently there are 1,616 students enrolled and 83 teachers. The aforementioned house accommodated the three classrooms, the bathrooms and a kitchen, but was converted into an Assembly Hall, a sewing room and a library after the building of new classrooms. Presently on that historical site is the music room, the netball, volleyball, and basketball courts and a beautiful garden.

Expansions did not stop, as a World Bank project extended the "B" Block which housed the Home Economics and Business Departments. Since then, three other blocks have been added, with the most recent addition being the Sixth Form block which was relocated and expanded in 2007.

In 1960, the school began with only five clubs (including the popular Glee Club) and offered nine subjects, including Latin. The curriculum now comprises 26 subjects at the CSEC level and 30 units at the CAPE Level. The co-curricular activities have also increased to 21. During lunch time, students dined under an air of classical music; a tradition that still remains today, but in a more modernistic form. A more recent tradition has also been embarked upon: the playing of the National anthem of Jamaica at the beginning of school.

The House system was introduced in January 1962; two years after the school first opened its doors and the first inter-house sports competition in March 1962. The four houses then, Harry, Henry, Stanley, and Whitehorne, competed. Harry House won that event. Cargill and Clarke Houses were later added. Cargill House was named after the second principal, the late Mr. E. U. Cargill and Clarke House after the late track coach, Mr. Douglas Clarke.

The first Cadet inspection was held in February 1966. The Unit has grown over the years and has come to be the most successful in the nation.

To date, the school has had five principals: Mr. L. W. Brown, Mr. E. U. Cargill, Mr. P. N. Hamilton, Lt. Col. E. V. Johnson and currently Mrs.J.F. Sadaar.

Campus 
The campus is located in hilly Highgate Saint Mary Parish, Jamaica. It has grown considerably since the time of its opening in 1960 and has the largest campus of any high school in St. Mary. The school has a large auditorium, cafeteria/lunch room, many computer and science labs, a well stocked and professional library adjacent to the sixth form block, in addition to numerous classroom blocks and several staff-rooms.

Although St. Mary High School is not a boarding institution, foreign or out of town teachers have on-campus living options with apartment style cottages across from the nurses and guidance counselors stations. The school has a spacious volleyball/netball court that is often called the Cadet Square and a football field across the main roadway that runs parallel to the campus.

The school compound is maintained quite well and this is a direct result of the strict discipline and school pride that is instilled from first formers upwards.

Uniforms are worn, which for girls is a green tunic with white blouse, and for boys khaki pants and shirt, with green epaulettes with white or yellow stripes to indicate grades. Female students at the sixth form level wear green pleated skirts along with short sleeved white shirts, a school crest attached to shirt pocket, and a green, white and yellow striped tie. Male sixth form students wear the traditional khaki pants along with a white short or long sleeved shirt, school crest attached to front pocket, and the same tie worn by their female counterparts.

Curriculum 
Subjects offered to students include Technical Drawing, Building Technology, Industrial Technology, Mathematics, Physical Education, General Science, Social Studies, Home Economics, Biology, Geography, History, Physics, Food and Nutrition, Clothing and Textiles, Principles of Accounting, Office Administration, Principles of Business, English, Sociology, Music, Chemistry, Information Technology, Visual Art, Literature, Law, Spanish, Agricultural Science, and Religious Education.

Students take the Caribbean Examinations Council (CXC) Exam after five years at the school. Grades attained in the CXC Exam determine which students move on to tertiary institutions, and which move on to grades 12 and 13 sixth form.

Notable alumni 
Floyd Morris – first visually-challenged Jamaican Senator/President of the senate in Jamaica
Professor Verene Shepherd – Professor of Social History, University of the West Indies
Nikole Mitchell: Olympic athlete (Barcelona 1992, Bronze Medal Relay Team
Percival Spencer: Olympic athlete (Atlanta 1996)
 Javed Jaghai - Dartmouth College graduate 

 Andrea Collins-Pettigrew -Senior Resident Magistrate Mr. Mullins
 Dr. Michael S Steele-High School Principal in Brooklyn New York

Principals 
 Mr. L. W. Brown
 Mr. E.U. Cargill (1970-1982/3?)
 Mr. P. N. Hamilton (1982/3 -)
 Lt. Col. E. V. Johnson(  -2014?)
 Mrs. Julliet Frazer-Sadaar (2014 - Present)

See also 
 Jamaica High School Football Champions
 Education in Jamaica
 List of Schools in Jamaica

References

External links 
Aerial view.
Past Student Page
Photo from St. Mary High School

Schools in Jamaica
Buildings and structures in Saint Mary Parish, Jamaica
High schools in Jamaica
Educational institutions established in 1960
1960 establishments in Jamaica